Maharashtra Major State Highway 3, commonly referred to as MH MSH 3, is a major state highway that runs  through Solapur, Osmanabad, Latur, Nanded, Yavatmal, Wardha and Nagpur districts in the state of Maharashtra and Major State Highway 11 (Maharashtra). This state highway touches numerous cities and villages VIZ. Solapur, Tuljapur, Ausa, Latur, Chakur, Ahmedpur, Nanded, Umarkhed, Mahagaon, Arni, Yavatmal, Wardha -  Butibori - Via NH 7 Uptill Nagpur.

Summary 
This Highway is the longest State Highway in Maharashtra State.
This highway is already declared National Highway as NH 204 by  Government of India. NH 204 is starting from Ratnagiri in Ratnagiri district passing through Kholapur, Sangli, Solapur and passing along with MH MSH 3 up to Butibori 28 km south of Nagpur city

Route description 
Below is the brief summary of the route followed by this state highway.

Major junctions

National highways 
 NH 9 near Solapur city.
 NH 211 near Solapur city.
 NH 222 in Nanded city.
 NH 7 at Butibori near Nagpur city.

State highways

Connections 
Many villages, cities and towns in various districts are connected by this state highway.

See also 
 List of State Highways in Maharashtra

References 

State Highways in Maharashtra
State Highways in Nagpur District